Humaitá (S41) is a Brazilian Riachuelo-class submarine built for the Brazilian Navy by ICN in Itaguaí, and DCNS.

The Brazilian boats are larger in length, tonnage and cargo capacity compared to the original French project.

Program history 
In 2008, Brazil purchased four enlarged Scorpènes for USD 10 billion with a total technology transfer agreement and a second agreement to develop the first Brazilian nuclear-powered submarine, . The hull of Riachuelo was laid down at Cherbourg, France on 27 May 2010 and it was jumboized at the Brazilian Navy Shipyard in Itaguaí in late 2012.

The first submarine Riachuelo was launched on 14 December 2018, and began sea trials in September 2019, the Humaitá was launched on 11 December 2020.

Development and design 
The first stage of construction of the Humaitá took place in September 2013 in Brazil, at the headquarters of ICN in Itaguaí, with the cutting of the first steel plates of the structure. At this point, technology transfer from French technicians to Brazilians had already started.

The other boats of the Brazilian class are Riachuelo (S40), Tonelero (S42) and Angostura (S43).

Namesake
Humaitá is the fifth boat and the third submarine of the Brazilian Navy to receive this name, in honor of a military operation, which took place in 1868, in the Paraguayan War.

The other submarines were:
(1957–1967)
(1973–1993)

References 

Attack submarines
Riachuelo-class submarine
Ships built in Brazil
2020 ships
Submarines of Brazil